The Ancient Magus' Bride is an anime series based on Kore Yamazaki's manga series. A three-part prequel anime was announced in the fifth volume of the manga. The series is titled . It is directed by Norihiro Naganuma and written by Kore Yamazaki, with scripts by Aya Takaha. Wit Studio produced the animation and Production I.G is credited with planning and production. Hirotaka Katō designed the characters and Bamboo is in charge of the background art. The series' music is composed by Junichi Matsumoto and produced by Flying Dog. The episodes were bundled with the sixth, seventh and eighth volumes of the manga, between September 10, 2016, March 10, 2017, and September 9, 2017. The first episode was shown in theaters for two weeks, starting on August 13, 2016; the second episode premiered on February 4, 2017; and the third episode premiered on August 19, 2017. Crunchyroll began streaming the first episode on September 10, 2016. An anime television series adaptation was announced on March 10, 2017, and aired from October 7, 2017, to March 24, 2018, on Mainichi Broadcasting System, Tokyo MX, BS11 and other Japanese channels. JUNNA performed the opening theme "Here", and Hana Itoki performed the ending theme . Funimation streamed an English dub.

An original three-part OVA series titled  was announced in March 2021, and the episodes were bundled with the sixteenth, seventeenth and eighteenth volumes of the manga, released on September 10, 2021, March 10, 2022, and September 10, 2022. The OVA series is animated by Studio Kafka, which was established by Japanese production company Twin Engine for creating the project. It was directed by Kazuaki Terasawa, with scripts by Aya Takaha and Yoko Yonaiyama. Hirotaka Katō returned to design the characters, and Junichi Matsumoto returned to compose the music.

A second season was announced on September 5, 2022. Studio Kafka is returning from the OVA to produce the season, with Kazuaki Terasawa returning to direct. Chiaki Nishinaka is joining Aya Takaha and Yoko Yonaiyama in writing the screenplay. Hirotaka Katō and Junichi Matsumoto are also returning as character designer and composer. The season is set to premiere in April 2023.

Episode list

Season 1

OVAs

Those Awaiting a Star (2016–17)

The Boy From the West and the Knight of the Mountain Haze (2021–22)

Home video release

Japanese
Shochiku released the series on Blu-ray in Japan on four volumes, with the first volume released on November 29, 2017, and the final one released on July 25, 2018.

English
The series was released in North America by Funimation, who released the series in two volumes. The first volume received a limited edition combo set release and a standard combo set release on January 29, 2019, and the second volume received a standard combo set release on April 16, 2019. Manga Entertainment released the series in the United Kingdom and Ireland, releasing the first volume on a standard combo set on April 1, 2019, and the second volume on June 3, 2019. In Australia and New Zealand, Madman Entertainment imported Funimation's North American release, releasing the limited edition first volume set on March 6, 2019, the standard edition first volume on April 3, 2019, and the second volume on June 5, 2019.

References

Lists of anime episodes